Conjurer Making Ten Hats in Sixty Seconds, also advertised as Dix Chapeaux en une minute and Dix Chapeaux à la minute, is an 1896 French short film directed by Georges Méliès. It was released by Méliès's company Star Film and is numbered 42 in its catalogues. The film is currently presumed lost.

References

External links 
 

1896 films
French silent short films
French black-and-white films
French short documentary films
Films directed by Georges Méliès
Lost French films
Films about magic and magicians
1890s short documentary films
1890s lost films
1890s French films